Guillermo Alejandro Vázquez Herrera (born May 25, 1967, in Mexico City) is a Mexican former professional footballer and manager.

Vázquez debuted for Pumas UNAM during the 1984–85 season. He has also played for Tecos, Monterrey, Toros Neza and Pachuca. He was an experienced midfielder who ensured a calm and controlled midfield.

Management career
Vázquez began as an interim coach for Pumas UNAM after Miguel España was sacked. Vázquez coached the last five matches of the Clausura 2006 with two victories, two draws, and one loss. For the Apertura 2006 Pumas UNAM hired Ricardo Ferretti and Vázquez became his assistant coach.

In July 2010, when Ricardo Ferretti left Pumas for Tigres de la UANL, Vázquez was given the head coach position.

Managerial statistics

Managerial statistics

Honours

Player
UNAM
 CONCACAF Champions' Cup: 1989

Monterrey
 Copa México: 1991–92

UAG
 Mexican Primera División: 1993–94

Manager
UNAM
 Mexican Primera División: Clausura 2011

Cruz Azul
 Copa MX: Clausura 2013

Individual
 Best Coach of the tournament: Clausura 2011

References

External links
 
 

1967 births
Living people
Mexico under-20 international footballers
Liga MX players
C.F. Monterrey players
Atlas F.C. footballers
C.F. Pachuca players
Mexican football managers
Tecos F.C. footballers
Club Universidad Nacional footballers
Club Universidad Nacional managers
Cruz Azul managers
Toros Neza footballers
Footballers from Mexico City
Mexican footballers
Liga MX managers
Association football midfielders